Shafuan Sutohmoh is a Singaporean footballer who formerly played in the S.League, a top tier football league in Singapore. He would then later go on play for Singapore National Football League side Gymkhana FC and captain the team in the 2017 National Football League Division 2.

References

1985 births
Living people
Gombak United FC players
Balestier Khalsa FC players
Woodlands Wellington FC players
Gymkhana FC players
Association football midfielders
Singaporean footballers